The discography of American rapper Eve consists of four studio albums, 37 singles (including 23 as a featured artist), 5 promotional singles and 30 music videos.

Studio albums

Singles

As lead artist

As featured artist

Promotional singles

Other charted songs

Guest appearances

Soundtrack appearances

Notes

References

Discographies of American artists
Hip hop discographies